"Dad/Revenge" is a single by Canadian punk rock band Nomeansno. Recorded in 1985, it features two tracks from Nomeansno's 1986 album Sex Mad. "Dad" was a minor college radio hit.

Background and release
Nomeansno entered Keye Studios late in 1985 to record Sex Mad, their first album after becoming a three-piece with the addition of guitarist Andy Kerr joining founding members Rob and John Wright.  Initially released on the Canadian label Psyche Industry Records, the album was picked up by Alternative Tentacles in 1986 and reissued in the United States and Europe.

Alternative Tentacles released the "Dad/Revenge" 7" vinyl single in 1987 to support the album.  Additionally, the royalties from the sale of the single were donated to the No More Censorship Defense Fund.

Reception
AllMusic critic Ned Raggett retrospectively praised both songs on the single.  He called "Dad" "...a bit chilling, even though it's spit out at slam-pit's pace".  He further noted the classic rock influence which contrasts with the band's punk rock influences, stating that "the chorus of 'Revenge' is perfectly anthemic stadium rock, and works on that level without a problem." Writing for Trouser Press, critic Ira Robbins praised the band for "pour[ing] out punky collegiate weirdness and slash'n'burn egghead energy."

Track listing
All songs written by Nomeansno

Side A
 "Dad"  – 3:01
Side B
 "Revenge"  – 5:21

Personnel
Nomeansno
Andy Kerr – guitar, vocals, bass
Rob Wright – bass, vocals, guitar
John Wright – drums, keyboards, vocals

Production and artwork
Craig Bougie and John Wright – engineering, mixing
Nomeansno – production

References

External links
Official Nomeansno web page

1985 songs
1987 singles
Nomeansno songs